The Winking Idol is a 1926 American silent Western film serial, consisting of 10 chapters, starring William Desmond and Eileen Sedgwick. Directed by Francis Ford, the screenplay was written by Arthur Henry Gooden, George Morgan and Charles E. van Loan. This serial was released by Universal Pictures and is considered to be a lost film.

Cast
 William Desmond as Dave Ledbetter
 Eileen Sedgwick as Jean Wilson
 Jack Richardson as Crawford Lange
 Grace Cunard as Thora Lange
 Moravana as Komi
 Herbert Sutch as Jim Wilson
 Dorothy Gulliver
 Artie Ortego
 Helen Broneau
 Vanna Carroll
 Syd Saylor (as Les Sailor)

Chapters
The Eye Of Evil
Buzzards' Roost
Crashing Timbers
Racing for Love
The Vanishing Bride
The Torrent of Terror
Flames of Fear
The Fight at the Falls
In the Danger of Dynamite
The Lost Lode

See also
 List of film serials
 List of film serials by studio

References

External links
 

1926 films
1926 lost films
American silent serial films
1926 Western (genre) films
American black-and-white films
Universal Pictures film serials
Films directed by Francis Ford
Lost Western (genre) films
Lost American films
Silent American Western (genre) films
1920s American films
1920s English-language films